Michve Allon (Mercaz khinukh vehadrakha Allon) (Allon Education and Instructional Center)
is an IDF military training base located in the Galilee, near Safed and  Maghar.

History
Michve Allon is a training base of the IDF  Education and Youth Corps. It is  named for Yigal Allon. 

The base operates an ulpan (Hebrew language school) for soldiers whose Hebrew is deemed insufficient by the IDF. It accepts new immigrants, Druze and Bedouin soldiers, who study Hebrew  together with basic training.

Until the 1980s, Michve Allon served as the base for the Bislamach Brigade, but that brigade transferred to a base near Yeruham. The base's goal is to train soldiers for special groups, help them integrate into their service, and become productive citizens of Israel.

References

 

Military installations of Israel